is a Japanese footballer currently playing as a forward for Giravanz Kitakyushu.

Career statistics

Club
.

Notes

References

External links

1997 births
Living people
Japanese footballers
Association football forwards
J2 League players
Giravanz Kitakyushu players